Darıca Gençlerbirliği is a sports club located in Turkey.

References

External links
Official website
Darıca Gençlerbirliği on TFF.org

 
Football clubs in Turkey
Association football clubs established in 1934
Sport in İzmit
1934 establishments in Turkey